Desert Mothers is a neologism, coined in feminist theology in analogy to Desert Fathers, for the ammas or  female Christian ascetics living in the desert of Egypt, Palestine, and Syria in the 4th and 5th centuries AD. They typically lived in the monastic communities that began forming during that time, though sometimes they lived as hermits. Other women from that era who influenced the early ascetic or monastic tradition while living outside the desert are also described as Desert Mothers.

The Desert Fathers are much more well known because most of the early lives of the saints "were written by men for a male monastic audience"—the occasional stories about the Desert Mothers come from the early Desert Fathers and their biographers. Many desert women had leadership roles within the Christian community. The Apophthegmata Patrum, or Sayings of the Desert Fathers, includes forty-seven sayings that are actually attributed to the Desert Mothers. There are several chapters dedicated to the Desert Mothers in the Lausiac History by Palladius, who mentions 2,975 women living in the desert. Other sources include the various stories told over the years about the lives of saints of that era, traditionally called vitae ("life"). The lives of twelve female desert saints are described in Book I of Vitae Patrum (Lives of the Fathers).

Notable examples

The Desert Mothers were known as ammas ("spiritual mothers"), comparable to the Desert Fathers (abbas), due to the respect they earned as spiritual teachers and directors. One of the most well known Desert Mothers was Amma Syncletica of Alexandria, who had twenty-seven sayings attributed to her in the Sayings of the Desert Fathers. Two other ammas, Theodora of Alexandria and Amma Sarah of the Desert, also had sayings in that book. Desert Mothers described in the Lausiac History include Melania the Elder, Melania the Younger, Olympias, Saint Paula and her daughter Eustochium, and several women whom the author does not name.

According to written accounts, Amma Syncletica might have been born around AD 270, since she is said to have lived to her eighties in about AD 350, to wealthy parents in Alexandria and was well educated, including an early study of the writings of Desert Father Evagrius Ponticus. After the death of her parents, she sold everything she had and gave the money to the poor. Moving outside the city with her blind sister, she lived as a hermit among the tombs outside of Alexandria. Gradually a community of women ascetics grew up around her, who she served as their spiritual mother. Even though she was an ascetic and hermit, Syncletica taught moderation, and that asceticism was not an end in itself.

Theodora of Alexandria was the amma of a monastic community of women near Alexandria. Prior to that, she had fled to the desert disguised as a man and joined a community of monks. She was sought out by many of the Desert Fathers for advice—reportedly Bishop Theophilus of Alexandria came to her for counsel.

Sarah of the Desert's sayings indicate that she was a hermit living by a river for sixty years. Her sharp replies to some of the old men who challenged her show a distinctly strong personality. According to one story, two male anchorites visited her in the desert and decided, "Let's humiliate this old woman." They said to her, "Be careful not to become conceited thinking to yourself: "Look how anchorites are coming to see me, a mere woman." She replied, "According to nature I am a woman, but not according to my thoughts."

Melania the Elder, the daughter of a Roman official, became widowed at a young age and moved to Alexandria, and then to the Nitrian Desert. She met several of the Desert Fathers, following them in their travels and ministering to them using her own money. At one point she was thrown into prison for supporting them, after several of the Fathers had been banished by the officials in Palestine. She eventually founded a convent in Jerusalem which had about fifty nuns. Her granddaughter, Melania the Younger, was married at the age of thirteen and had two sons, both of whom died at a young age. When she was twenty, she and her husband Pinianus renounced the world, both founding convents and monasteries.

According to Averil Cameron, women were quite prominent in the desert tradition, even though early accounts often leave women nameless. In Cameron’s opinion there is no distinction between the men’s wise sayings and that of Amma Sarah and Amma Syncletia. One text refers to Theodora, who had monks listening to her counsel and asking questions. Some women converted their houses into religious establishments and there were sex-mixed social/religious groups. Women could not obtain ordination as a deacon or a priest.

Desert Mothers are honored with a Lesser Feast on the liturgical calendar of the Episcopal Church in the United States of America on January 5.

Sayings
Amma Sarah said, "If I prayed God that all people should approve of my conduct, I should find myself a penitent at the door of each one, but I shall rather pray that my heart may be pure toward all."
Amma Syncletica said, "In the beginning there are a great many battles and a good deal of suffering for those who are advancing towards God and afterwards, ineffable joy. It is like those who wish to light a fire; at first they are choked by the smoke and cry, and by this means obtain what they seek ... so we must also kindle the divine fire in ourselves through tears and hard work."
Amma Syncletica said, "There are many who live in the mountains and behave as if they were in the town; they are wasting their time. It is possible to be a solitary in one's mind while living in a crowd; and it is possible for those who are solitaries to live in the crowd of their own thoughts."
Amma Theodora said that neither asceticism, nor vigils, nor any kind of suffering are able to save. Only true humility can do that. There was a hermit who was able to banish the demons. And he asked them: "What makes you go away? Is it fasting?" They replied: "We do not eat or drink." "Is it vigils?" They said: "We do not sleep." "Then what power sends you away?" They replied: "Nothing can overcome us except humility alone." Amma Theodora said: "Do you see how humility is victorious over the demons?"

See also

 Blaesilla
 Catherine of Alexandria
 Christian monasticism
 Demiana
 Domnina of Syria
 Eastern Christian monasticism
 Eustochium
 John Chryssavgis
 Macrina the Elder
 Macrina the Younger
 Margaret the Virgin
 Mary of Egypt
 Melania the Younger
 Menodora, Metrodora, and Nymphodora
 Paula of Rome
 Saint Pelagia
 Sarah of the Desert
 Syncletica of Alexandria
 Theoktiste of Lesbos

References

Citations

Works cited

Further reading

 

Asceticism
Christian monasticism
Christian orders
Christian religious occupations
Christian terminology
Egyptian hermits
Late Ancient Christian female saints
Anglican saints